Ruben Kluivert (born 21 May 2001) is a Dutch professional footballer who plays as a defender for Utrecht.

Career
Born in Amsterdam, Kluivert began playing as a youth for local club Amsterdamsche FC before moving to FC Utrecht, where he made his senior debut with the reserve team in the Eerste Divisie. He made his first-team debut on 11 May 2022 in the Eredivisie as an added-time substitute for Willem Janssen in a 2–2 home draw with AZ Alkmaar.

Personal life
Kluivert hails from a footballing family. His grandfather Kenneth played for Surinamese team S.V. Robinhood and moved to the Netherlands in 1970. His father, Patrick, played for European clubs including AFC Ajax and FC Barcelona, and was a long-time Dutch international. His older brother Justin is also a professional footballer, whose teams include Ajax, A.S. Roma and the Dutch national team.

Career statistics

Club

References

2001 births
Living people
Dutch people of Curaçao descent
Dutch sportspeople of Surinamese descent
Dutch footballers
Association football defenders
Eerste Divisie players
Amsterdamsche FC players
FC Utrecht players
Jong FC Utrecht players
Kluivert family